Kishawara is an administrative unit, known as Union council, of Swat District in the Khyber Pakhtunkhwa province of Pakistan.
District Swat has 7 Tehsils i.e. Khwazakhela, Kabal, Bahrain, Barikot, Babuzai, Charbagh, and Matta. Each Tehsill comprises certain numbers of union councils. There are 65 union councils in district Swat, 56 rural and 09 urban.

See also 

 Swat District

References

External links
Khyber-Pakhtunkhwa Government website section on Lower Dir
United Nations
Hajjinfo.org Uploads
 PBS paiman.jsi.com

Swat District
Populated places in Swat District
Union councils of Khyber Pakhtunkhwa
Union Councils of Swat District